The Jardin Catherine-Labouré is a park of about 7,000 square metres in Paris's Seventh Arrondissement, on Rue Babylone.  
This garden with grapevines and ornamental berries was the potager of the convent of the  Daughters of Charity since 1633 and has been open to the public since 1977.  There is a community garden along with an arbor-covered pathway.

References

External links
; The New York Times, 29 June 2008.
; Paris.7.evous.

7th arrondissement of Paris
Catherine-Laboure, Jardin